Luke Owen Jephcott (born 26 January 2000) is a Welsh professional footballer who plays for Swindon Town on loan from Plymouth Argyle and the Wales under-21 national team.

Club career
On 9 September 2018 Jephcott made his Wales U19 debut in a friendly against Ireland U19s at the City Calling Stadium. Wales won the game 1–0.

Whilst still an apprentice, Jephcott made his professional debut in the EFL League One on 20 October 2018. He featured against Burton Albion in a 3–2 defeat, replacing Stuart O'Keefe in the 86th minute. Jephcott's full debut came ten days later, when he started in a 5-0 EFL Trophy defeat to Chelsea U21s.

In August 2019, Jephcott joined Truro City on loan. He was recalled by his parent club, Plymouth Argyle, in January 2020. Jephcott won both the EFL League Two Player of the Month and EFL Young Player of the Month awards for January 2020, after scoring 5 goals in 4 starts in January 2020.  Jephcott finished the season with 7 goals in 14 games as Plymouth won promotion to League One.

Jepchott started the 20/21 season strongly by scoring the winner on the opening day against Blackpool.  He scored 1 in the next 7 games before starting a sensational run of form, scoring 14 goals in the next 18 league games, which attracted interest from a clutch of Championship clubs including Stoke City and Cardiff City.

On 1 September 2022, Jephcott signed for EFL League Two club Swindon Town on an initial loan deal with the option to join the club permanently.

International career
Jephcott was born in Aberystwyth, Wales. He was first called up to the Wales U19 team in 2018.  He made his debut for Wales Under 21s in a 3–0 win against Moldova

Career statistics

Honours
Individual
 EFL League Two Player of the Month: January 2020

References

2000 births
Living people
Welsh footballers
Wales youth international footballers
Wales under-21 international footballers
Association football forwards
Plymouth Argyle F.C. players
Truro City F.C. players
Swindon Town F.C. players
Southern Football League players
English Football League players